{{DISPLAYTITLE:C18H24Cl2N2O}}
The molecular formula C18H24Cl2N2O (molar mass: 355.30 g/mol, exact mass: 354.1266 u) may refer to:

 BRL-52537
 LPK-26